Lan Sak is a district (amphoe) in northern Uthai Thani province, northern Thailand.

History
Tambons Lan Sak and Pradu Yuen of Ban Rai district were combined as a minor district (king amphoe) on 15 October 1975. The minor district office was in Ban Pak Muean. It was upgraded to a full district on 13 July 1981. At the same time, the office was moved to Ban Kao.

Geography
Neighboring districts are (from the east clockwise) Sawang Arom, Thap Than, Nong Chang, Huai Khot, and Ban Rai of Uthai Thani Province; Mae Poen and Chum Ta Bong of Nakhon Sawan province.

The important water resources are the Huai Thap Salao reservoir and Kha Khaeng River (Huai Kha Khaeng).

Administration
The district is divided into six sub-districts (tambons), which are further subdivided into 81 villages (mubans). The township (thesaban tambon) Lan Sak covers parts of tambons Lan Sak and Pradu Yuen. There are a further six tambon administrative organizations (TAO).

Nature
Hup Pa Tat is a broad valley located in the north of Uthai Thani Province.

References

External links
amphoe.com

Lan Sak